is one of three subfamilies of the loach catfish family Amphiliidae, it consists of five genera endemic to the Afrotropics which contain a total of 28 currently recognised species. They are small catfish measuring between 20mm and 80mm.

References

 
Fish of Africa